USS Oregon City (CA-122), the lead ship of the  of heavy cruisers, was laid down 8 April 1944 by Bethlehem Steel Company, Quincy, Massachusetts; launched 9 June 1945; sponsored by Mrs. Raymond P. Canfield, wife of the City Commissioner of Oregon City, Oregon. Newspapers showed pictures of celebrated radio, film and television personality Bing Crosby adding a bit of glamor to the launching. The Oregon City was commissioned 16 February 1946.Oregon City was named for the city in the state of Oregon. Oregon City departed Boston 31 March 1946 for shakedown out of Guantanamo Bay Naval Base, then returned to Boston in mid-May.
Oregon City became flagship of the United States Fourth Fleet on 3 July and the following month began dockside training of reservists in Philadelphia. From 6 to 19 October she made a post-war Reserve Training Cruise, to Bermuda, then sailed to Boston and remained until the following March with a somewhat reduced complement. Reassigned to the 2nd Fleet in January 1947, Oregon Citys crew had returned to full strength by the time she sailed for Guantanamo Bay 30 March. After three weeks of exercises she returned to Boston, not sailing again until 6 June. She embarked midshipmen at Annapolis on the 21st, then sailed for the Canal Zone and the Caribbean on an annual summer training cruise.

Oregon City debarked her midshipmen at Norfolk in mid-August and sailed for Philadelphia and deactivation. She was decommissioned on 15 December 1947. She was the only Oregon City-class ship to be decommissioned soon after completion, and was not selected for conversion to a missile ship. Her bell was sent back to Oregon where it is on display at the Museum of the Oregon Territory in Oregon City, Oregon. She was stricken 1 November 1970, and sold 17 September 1973 to Union Minerals and Alloys Corporation, NYC, and scrapped in Kearny, New Jersey the following year. Her 5" gun houses could still be seen well into the 90s at Philadelphia Navy Yard.

The bell originally from USS Oregon City was presented to Portland Area Naval Reserve through the people of Oregon City, Oregon on 8 March 1975 and it is now on display at Museum of Oregon Territory. A model of her is also on displayed there.

Gallery

Awards 
 American Campaign Medal 
 World War 2 Victory Medal
 National Defense Service Medal

References

External links

 

Oregon City-class cruisers
Ships built in Quincy, Massachusetts
1945 ships
Atlantic Reserve Fleet, Philadelphia Group